Linda Pearson (born 6 March 1964) is a Scottish clay target shooter. She competed in the women's double trap event at the 2018 Commonwealth Games, winning the bronze medal. Linda has represented Great Britain in four different international clay target disciplines: Olympic Trap, Double Trap, Universal Trench and Compak Sporting.

Linda is the current British and Scottish record holder for the Double Trap discipline.

References

1964 births
Living people
Scottish female sport shooters
Place of birth missing (living people)
Shooters at the 2018 Commonwealth Games
Commonwealth Games bronze medallists for Scotland
Commonwealth Games medallists in shooting
British female sport shooters
Medallists at the 2018 Commonwealth Games